The following pages for each decade list films produced in Pakistan by year of release.

Pre-1950
List of Pakistani films before 1950

1950s
List of Pakistani films of 1950
List of Pakistani films of 1951 
List of Pakistani films of 1952
List of Pakistani films of 1953
List of Pakistani films of 1954
List of Pakistani films of 1955
List of Pakistani films of 1956
List of Pakistani films of 1957
List of Pakistani films of 1958
List of Pakistani films of 1959

1960s
List of Pakistani films of 1960
List of Pakistani films of 1961
List of Pakistani films of 1962
List of Pakistani films of 1963
List of Pakistani films of 1964
List of Pakistani films of 1965
List of Pakistani films of 1966
List of Pakistani films of 1967
List of Pakistani films of 1968
List of Pakistani films of 1969

1970s
List of Pakistani films of 1970
List of Pakistani films of 1971
List of Pakistani films of 1972
List of Pakistani films of 1973
List of Pakistani films of 1974
List of Pakistani films of 1975
List of Pakistani films of 1976
List of Pakistani films of 1977
List of Pakistani films of 1978
List of Pakistani films of 1979

1980s
List of Pakistani films of 1980
List of Pakistani films of 1981
List of Pakistani films of 1982
List of Pakistani films of 1983
List of Pakistani films of 1984
List of Pakistani films of 1985
List of Pakistani films of 1986
List of Pakistani films of 1987
List of Pakistani films of 1988
List of Pakistani films of 1989

1990s
List of Pakistani films of 1990
List of Pakistani films of 1991
List of Pakistani films of 1992
List of Pakistani films of 1993
List of Pakistani films of 1994
List of Pakistani films of 1995
List of Pakistani films of 1996
List of Pakistani films of 1997
List of Pakistani films of 1998
List of Pakistani films of 1999

2000s
List of Pakistani films of 2000
List of Pakistani films of 2001
List of Pakistani films of 2002
List of Pakistani films of 2003
List of Pakistani films of 2004
List of Pakistani films of 2005
List of Pakistani films of 2006
List of Pakistani films of 2007
List of Pakistani films of 2008
List of Pakistani films of 2009

2010s
 List of Pakistani films of 2010
 List of Pakistani films of 2011
 List of Pakistani films of 2012
 List of Pakistani films of 2013
 List of Pakistani films of 2014
 List of Pakistani films of 2015
 List of Pakistani films of 2016
 List of Pakistani films of 2017
 List of Pakistani films of 2018
 List of Pakistani films of 2019

2020s
 List of Pakistani films of 2020
 List of Pakistani films of 2021
 List of Pakistani films of 2022
 List of Pakistani films of 2023

See also 
 Cinema of Pakistan
 List of Pakistani Punjabi-language films
 List of Pashto-language films
 List of Sindhi-language films
 List of Pakistani animated films
 List of highest-grossing Pakistani films
 List of highest-grossing films in Pakistan
 List of years in Pakistan
 List of years in Pakistani television

External links
 Search Pakistani film - IMDB.com

